Valter Vissarionovich Sanaya (also spelled Walter Sanaya; ; 24 September 1925 – 29 October 1999) was a Soviet football player. A native of Ochamchire, Georgia, Sanaya played as a goalkeeper.

He started his professional football career at FC Dinamo Sukhumi during the 1941 season. In 1944, he then joined FC Dinamo Tbilisi. In the 1946 season, Sanaya was hired by Dynamo Moscow, where he spent the next years. As a goalkeeper in Moscow, he was internally competing with teammates Alexei Khomich and later Lev Yashin and finally took a back seat. After a short return to Dinamo Tbilisi in 1954, he joined Neftyanik Baku. He retired in 1956.

His daughter is former figure skater Marina Sanaya, Walter Sanaya is also a distant cousin of Zurab Sanaya. He died in 1999 in Moscow.

References

Footballers from Abkhazia
1925 births
1999 deaths
People from Ochamchira District
Soviet footballers
FC Dinamo Tbilisi players
FC Dinamo Sukhumi players
FC Dynamo Moscow players
Soviet Top League players
Burials in Troyekurovskoye Cemetery
Association football goalkeepers